Senator Connell may refer to:

Kathleen S. Connell (born 1937), Rhode Island politician
Pat Connell (fl. 2010s), Montana State Senate

See also
Senator Connelly (disambiguation)